The 38th Annual TV Week Logie Awards was held on Sunday, April 21, 1996, at the Melbourne Park Function Centre in Melbourne, and broadcast on the Nine Network. The ceremony was hosted by Daryl Somers, and guests included Gloria Reuben and Holly Hunter.

Winners and nominees
The nominees for the 38th Logie Awards were announced in early April 1996. Unlike previous years, there were five nominations in each category. These were then cut to three on the night of the ceremony.

The winners were announced during the awards ceremony on 21 April 1996.

Winners are listed first, highlighted in boldface.

Gold Logie

Acting/Presenting
{| class=wikitable width="100%"
|-
! width="25%"| Most Popular Actor
! width="25%"| Most Popular Actress
|-
| valign="top"|
Dieter Brummer for Home and Away (Seven Network)
Guy Pearce for Snowy River: The McGregor Saga (Nine Network)
Martin Sacks for Blue Heelers (Seven Network)
Gary Sweet for Police Rescue (ABC)
John Wood for Blue Heelers (Seven Network)
| valign="top" |
Lisa McCune for Blue Heelers (Seven Network)
Tempany Deckert for Home and Away (Seven Network)
Isla Fisher for Home and Away (Seven Network)
Melissa George for Home and Away (Seven Network)
Rebecca Gibney for Halifax f.p. (Nine Network)
|-
! width="50%"| Most Outstanding Actor
! width="50%"| Most Outstanding Actress
|-
| valign="top"|
Richard Roxburgh for Blue Murder (ABC)
| valign="top"|
Jacqueline McKenzie for Halifax f.p. (Nine Network)
|-
! width="50%"| Most Popular New Talent
! width="50%"| Most Popular Light Entertainment Personality
|-
| valign="top"|
Nic Testoni for Home and Away (Seven Network)
Katrina Hobbs for Home and Away (Seven Network)
Wendy Mooney for Don't Forget Your Toothbrush (Nine Network)
John Seru for Australian Gladiators (Seven Network)
| valign="top"|
Daryl Somers for Hey Hey It's Saturday (Nine Network)
Ernie Dingo for The Great Outdoors (Seven Network)
Tim Ferguson for Don't Forget Your Toothbrush (Nine Network)
Sam Newman for AFL Footy Show (Nine Network)
Jo Beth Taylor for Australia's Funniest Home Video Show (Nine Network)
|-
! width="50%"| Most Popular Comedy Personality
|-
| valign="top"|
'Magda Szubanski for Full Frontal (Seven Network)
Andrew Denton for Denton (Seven Network)
Tim Ferguson for Don't Forget Your Toothbrush (Nine Network)
Jimeoin for Jimeoin (Seven Network)
Daryl Somers for Hey Hey It's Saturday (Nine Network)
|}

Most Popular Programs

Most Outstanding Programs

Most Outstanding Achievement in Drama ProductionWinner:Blue Murder (ABC TV)

Most Outstanding Achievement in Public AffairsWinner:"Minor Surgery, Major Risk", Four Corners (ABC TV)

Most Outstanding DocumentaryWinner:Untold Desires (SBS TV)

Most Outstanding Achievement in NewsWinner:"Muraroa Protests", National Nine News (Nine Network)

Most Outstanding Achievement in ComedyWinners:Frontline (ABC TV)

Most Outstanding Achievement by a Regional NetworkWinners:No Time For Frailty'' (Prime Television)

Performers
Kate Ceberano
John Farnham

Hall of Fame
After a lifetime in Australian television, Maurie Fields became the 13th inductee and 2nd posthumous inductee into the TV Week Logies Hall of Fame. However, Val Jellay accepted the award on his behalf.

References

External links
 

1996
1996 television awards
1996 in Australian television